Joe Frank Harris (born February 16, 1936) is an American businessman and Democratic politician who served as the 78th Governor of the U.S. state of Georgia from 1983 to 1991.

Early life and career 
Harris was born in the Atco Mill Village of Cartersville, Georgia, to Frank and Frances Harris. Harris was the second of three children with brother Fred Harris and sister Glenda Harris Gambill. Harris went on to graduate from the University of Georgia in 1958 with a degree in business administration. While attending Georgia, he also became a member of Lambda Chi Alpha fraternity. Upon graduation, Harris returned to his native Cartersville, Georgia to join his father Frank and brother Fred in the family run cement business.  Harris Cement Products, Inc. operated from 1940–1980, and during the late 1970s furnished all the cement for the bridges and overpasses constructed on Interstate 75 from Cobb County to Gordon County. Harris was persuaded to run for the Georgia House of Representatives in 1964 and served nine terms. Harris became the chairman of the Appropriations Committee in 1974.

Gubernatorial campaign 

When he ran for governor in 1982, Harris was seen as a long shot candidate, but with the support of the Speaker of the Georgia House Tom Murphy, he was able to win the primary over U.S. Representative Bo Ginn. Memphis, Tenn.-based consultant Deloss Walker played a key role in his campaign.

Gubernatorial accomplishments 
Harris called himself the education governor as he raised the state salaries for teachers. and implemented the Quality Basic Education Act (QBE), built the Georgia Dome, created the Technical College System of Georgia formerly known as the Department of Adult & Technical Education, and lured the 1996 Summer Olympics to Atlanta.  Harris is also credited with building more libraries during his term than any other governor in Georgia's history.  Also during his term, Harris created the Growth Strategies Commission chaired by Cartersville native and prominent developer Joel Cowan.

Board of regents 
After two terms as governor, Harris was appointed to the Board of Regents for the University System of Georgia serving for seven years, two years as chairman.

Georgia State University 
From 1995 through 2009 Harris served at Georgia State University as an executive fellow and lecturer in the School of Policy Studies. He is chairman of the board of Harris Georgia Corporation, an industrial development firm that was established in 1980 in Cartersville, Georgia. He also currently serves on the Board of Directors for Aflac.

Legacy 
The portion of U.S. Route 41 through Bartow County is named in his honor (Joe Frank Harris Parkway), as well as the Joe Frank Harris Commons that houses The Village Summit Dining Commons at the University of Georgia, the main entrance to the Georgia Ports Authority in Brunswick, Georgia (Joe Frank Harris Blvd.), and the main entrance to the Georgia State Fairgrounds in Perry (Governor Joe Frank and Mrs. Elizabeth Harris Blvd.).

References

See also 
New Georgia Encyclopedia Article .
 

|-

1936 births
Living people
Democratic Party members of the Georgia House of Representatives
Democratic Party governors of Georgia (U.S. state)
University of Georgia alumni
People from Cartersville, Georgia
American United Methodists